The UK Singles Chart is one of many music charts compiled by the Official Charts Company that calculates the best-selling singles of the week in the United Kingdom. Since 2004 the chart has been based on the sales of both physical singles and digital downloads, with airplay figures excluded from the official chart. Since 2014, the singles chart has been based on both sales and streaming, with the ratio altered in 2017 to 150:1 streams and only three singles by the same artist eligible for the chart. From July 2018, video streams from YouTube Music and Spotify among others began to be counted for the Official Charts. This list shows singles that peaked in the Top 10 of the UK Singles Chart during 2021, as well as singles which peaked in 2020 and 2022 but were in the top 10 in 2021. The entry date is when the song appeared in the top 10 for the first time (week ending, as published by the Official Charts Company, which is six days after the chart is announced).

One-hundred and five singles were in the top 10 this year. Fourteen singles from 2020 remained in the top 10 for several weeks at the beginning of the year, while "Seventeen Going Under" by Sam Fender, "Coming for You" by SwitchOTR featuring A1 x J1, "Overseas" by D-Block Europe featuring Central Cee, "ABCDEFU" by Gayle, "Rockin' Around the Christmas Tree" by Brenda Lee and "Come On Home for Christmas" by George Ezra were all released in 2021 but did not reach their peak until 2022. "Sweet Melody" by Little Mix, "34+35" by Ariana Grande, "Step into Christmas" by Elton John, "This Christmas" by Jess Glynne, "Whoopty" by CJ and "Rockin' Around the Christmas Tree" by Justin Bieber were the singles from 2020 to reach their peak in 2021. The Kid Laroi, Mimi Webb, Olivia Rodrigo, Sam Fender and Tom Grennan were among the many artists who achieved their first top 10 single in 2021.

"Last Christmas" by Wham!, originally released in 1984, topped the chart for the first time in the first week of 2021. The first new number-one single of the year was "Sweet Melody" by Little Mix. Overall, thirteen different songs peaked at number-one in 2021, with Ed Sheeran (4) having the most songs hit that position.

Background

Multiple entries
One hundred and five singles charted in the top 10 in 2021, with ninety-two singles reaching their peak this year (including the re-entry "Last Christmas").

"Last Christmas" finally reaches number-one
On New Year's Day 2021 (7 January 2021, week ending), Wham!'s iconic festive classic "Last Christmas", written by the group's lead singer George Michael, finally reached the coveted number-one spot in the UK chart. Upon its initial release in 1984, the single peaked at number two for five consecutive weeks. It returned to number two in 2017, one year after George Michael's death. The single finally reached the top spot more than 36 years after its initial release, the longest amount of time for a song to reach number-one, surpassing Tony Christie's almost 16 year-long record for the longest time a single has taken to top the UK Singles Chart after its initial release with "(Is This The Way To) Amarillo?" in March 2005, which had itself taken 33 years 4 months to top the chart (with Peter Kay, though credited, only actually appearing in the video). Prior to it reaching number one, "Last Christmas" had for many years held the record as the highest-selling single never to top the charts, with 1.9 million copies sold (not including streams).

Olivia Rodrigo becomes youngest solo artist to score UK chart double
On 28 May 2021 (3 June 2021, week ending), American singer Olivia Rodrigo became the youngest solo artist to achieve the coveted UK chart double at 18 years and 3 months old. Her single "Good 4 U" climbed to number-one in the UK Singles Chart after debuting at number two the previous week, while her debut album Sour entered the UK Albums Chart at number-one. Rodrigo became the first artist since Sam Smith in 2015 to garner a UK chart double with a debut album.

Little Mix set a new chart record 
On 29 July 2021, British girl group Little Mix became the first girl group to spend a 100 weeks inside the Top 10 of the Official UK Singles Chart. Heartbreak Anthem, the trio's collaboration with Swedish music duo Galantis, and French DJ David Guetta, placed at number 7, marking their 100th week in the Top 10 across all of their releases.

Måneskin become first Italian act with two simultaneous UK top-ten singles
On 25 June 2021 (1 July 2021, week ending), rock group Måneskin, winners of the 2021 Eurovision Song Contest, became the first act from Italy to have two singles in the top-ten of the UK Singles Chart simultaneously with "I Wanna Be Your Slave" at number six and "Beggin'" (a cover of the 1967 song by Frankie Valli and the Four Seasons) at number ten.

ABBA score first top-ten single in forty years
On 10 September 2021 (16 September 2021, week ending), Swedish pop music legends ABBA returned to the top-ten of the UK Singles Chart for the first time in almost forty years when "Don't Shut Me Down" debuted at number nine, becoming their 20th top-ten single. The group's last single to reach the top-ten of the UK charts was "One of Us", which peaked at number three in December 1981.

Elton John's comeback year
2021 proved to be the comeback year for Elton John in the UK Singles Chart, with the British music icon earning the eighth, ninth and tenth number-one singles of his career in less than three months.

On 15 October 2021 (21 October 2021, week ending), he achieved his first UK number-one single in sixteen years when his collaboration with Dua Lipa, "Cold Heart (Pnau remix)", rose to the top of the UK Singles Chart during its fifth week in the top-ten.

On 10 December 2021 (16 December 2021, week ending), his festive collaboration with Ed Sheeran, "Merry Christmas", entered the chart at number-one. The song claimed 76,700 chart sales in its first week, including 22,100 pure sales (physical + digital downloads) and 7.6 million streams. It also earned the biggest week of CD single sales of 2021, with 8,100 copies sold on disc during its first week of release.

On 24 December 2021 (30 December 2021, week ending), after two weeks at number-one, "Merry Christmas" was denied the Christmas number-one single by Sheeran and John's collaboration with LadBaby, "Sausage Rolls for Everyone".

Adele scores first UK number-one single in six years and sets new chart record
On 22 October 2021 (28 October 2021, week ending), Adele returned to the UK Singles Chart after a five-year absence when her single "Easy on Me" entered the chart at number-one. The song amassed 217,300 chart sales in its first week, the highest first week figure since Ed Sheeran's "Shape Of You", which earned 226,800 in January 2017. Adele also set a new chart record with the single as "Easy On Me" racked up 24 million streams in the UK in its first week of release, the most streams for a song in one week – topping Ariana Grande's record of 16.9 million set back in January 2019 with "7 Rings". "Easy On Me" also earned the biggest week of digital download sales of 2021 so far, with 23,500.

LadBaby makes chart history with fourth consecutive Christmas number-one single
LadBaby made chart history this year when his song "Sausage Rolls for Everyone", a sausage roll-themed parody of Ed Sheeran and Elton John's number-one single "Merry Christmas", and also featuring Sheeran and John, debuted at number-one in the UK Singles Chart on 24 December 2021 (30 December 2021, week ending), giving the Nottingham-born YouTuber and musician his fourth consecutive Christmas number-one single. LadBaby became only the second act in history, after The Beatles, to secure four Christmas number-one singles, but was the very first to achieve four consecutive Christmas chart-toppers, surpassing the records of both The Beatles and The Spice Girls. "Sausage Rolls for Everyone" also became the 70th Christmas number-one single in the history of the UK Singles Chart since its introduction in 1952.

Chart debuts
Thirty-one artists achieved their first charting top 10 single in 2021, either as a lead or featured artist. Of these, five artists went on to record another hit single that year: A1 x J1, Ardee, The Kid Laroi, Måneskin and Polo G. Central Cee and Tom Grennan both scored two more chart hits this year. Olivia Rodrigo achieved three more chart hits in her breakthrough year.

The following table (collapsed on desktop site) does not include acts who had previously charted as part of a group and secured their first top 10 solo single.

 Whilst Saweetie is a featured artist on the single version of "Confetti", the Official Charts does not recognise her as a featured artist for this particular entry.

Notes
Jesy Nelson earned her first UK top ten debut in October 2021 with "Boyz". This also became her first top 10 since her departure from UK girl band Little Mix in December 2020.

Best-selling singles
Ed Sheeran had the best-selling single of the year with "Bad Habits". The song spent 22 weeks in the top 10 (including eleven weeks at number-one), sold over 1,700,000 copies and was certified 2× platinum by the BPI. "Good 4 U" by Olivia Rodrigo came in second place, while Olivia Rodrigo's "Drivers License", "Save Your Tears" by The Weeknd and "Montero (Call Me By Your Name)" by Lil Nas X made up the top five. Songs by Dua Lipa, The Kid Laroi and Justin Bieber, Glass Animals, The Weeknd ("Blinding Lights") and Russ Millions and Tion Wayne were also in the top ten best-selling singles of the year.

Top-ten singles
Key

Entries by artist

The following table shows artists who have achieved two or more top 10 entries in 2021, including singles that reached their peak in 2020. The figures include both main artists and featured artists, while appearances on ensemble charity records are also counted for each artist. The total number of weeks an artist spent in the top ten in 2021 is also shown.

Notes 

 "Sweet Melody" re-entered the top 10 at number 9 on 7 January 2021 (week ending).
 "34+35" re-entered the top 10 at number 10 on 10 December 2020 (week ending).
 "All I Want fot Christmas Is You" re-entered the top 10 at number 2 on 10 December 2020 (week ending), and peaked at number-one for the first time ever on 17 December 2020 (week ending).
 "Last Christmas" re-entered the top 10 at number 3 on 10 December 2020 (week ending). Having originally peaked at number 2 in 1984, the song reached number-one for the first time ever on 7 January 2021 (week ending).
 "Fairytale of New York" re-entered the top 10 at number 8 on 10 December 2020 (week ending), having originally peaked at number 2 upon release in 1987.
 "Merry Christmas Everyone" re-entered the top 10 at number 6 on 17 December 2020 (week ending), having originally peaked at number 1 upon release in 1985.
 Released as a charity single by Band Aid in 1984 to aid famine relief in Ethiopia.
 "Do They Know It's Christmas?" re-entered the top 10 at number 8 on 17 December 2020 (week ending), having originally peaked at number 1 upon release in 1984.
 "It's Beginning to Look A lot Like Christmas" re-entered the top 10 at number 10 on 7 January 2021 (week ending).
 "Step Into Christmas" re-entered the top 10 at number 10 on 17 December 2020 (week ending).
 "This Christmas" entered the top 10 at number 9 on 24 December 2020 (week ending).
 "Whoopty" re-entered the top 10 at number 3 on 14 January 2021 (week ending).
 "Levitating" re-entered the top 10 at number 5 on 14 January 2021 (week ending).
 "34+35" re-entered the top 10 at number 8 on 14 January 2021 (week ending).
 "You Broke Me First" re-entered the top 10 at number 9 on 14 January 2021 (week ending).
 Figure includes a top-ten hit as a member of the group Wham!
 Figure includes an appearance on the "Do They Know It's Christmas?" charity single by Band Aid.
 "34+35" re-entered the top 10 at number 3 on 28 January 2021 (week ending), following the subsequent remix featuring Doja Cat and Megan Thee Stallion.
 "Get Out My Head" re-entered the top 10 at number 8 on 11 February 2021 (week ending).
 "Latest Trends" entered the top 10 at number 2 on 25 March (week ending), following the subsequent remix featuring Aitch.
 "Goosebumps (Remix)" re-entered the top 10 at number 10 on 25 March 2021 (week ending).
 Figure includes a feature on "Money Talks".
 Figure includes a feature on "Patience".
 "Body" entered the top 10 at number 4 on 6 May 2021 (week ending), following the subsequent remix featuring Bugzy Malone, Fivio Foreign, Darkoo, Buni, ArrDee, E1 and ZT.
 "Save Your Tears" entered the top 10 at number 8 on 13 May 2021 (week ending), following the subsequent remix featuring Ariana Grande.
 "Drivers License" re-entered the top 10 at number 6 on 10 June 2021 (week ending).
 "Traitor" re-entered the top 10 at number 5 on 17 June 2021 (week ending).
 "Three Lions" re-entered the top 10 at number 4 on 15 July 2021 (week ending), following England's success in the UEFA Euro 2020.
 "Traitor" re-entered the top 10 at number 10 on 15 July 2021 (week ending).
 "Save Your Tears" re-entered the top 10 at number 10 on 12 August 2021 (week ending).
 "Holiday" re-entered the top 10 at number 10 on 26 August 2021 (week ending).
 "Kiss My (Uh-Oh)" entered the top 10 at number 10 on 9 September (week ending), following the subsequent Girl Power remix featuring Raye, Becky Hill and Stefflon Don. 
 Figure includes a feature on "Wants and Needs".
 Figure includes a feature on "Girls Want Girls".
 "Happier Than Ever" re-entered the top 10 at number 9 on 14 October 2021 (week ending).
 Figure includes a feature on top-ten hit "Sweet Melody" as a then member of Little Mix.
 "My Universe" re-entered the top 10 at number 5 on 28 October 2021 (week ending) following the release of the album Music of the Spheres.
 "That's What I Want" re-entered the top 10 at number 10 on 28 October 2021 (week ending).
 Figure includes a feature on "Coming for You".
 Figure includes a feature on "Overseas".
 "All I Want fot Christmas Is You" re-entered the top 10 at number 3 on 9 December 2021 (week ending).
 "Last Christmas" re-entered the top 10 at number 4 on 9 December 2021 (week ending).
 "Merry Christmas Everyone" re-entered the top 10 at number 6 on 16 December 2021 (week ending).
 "Fairytale of New York" re-entered the top 10 at number 7 on 16 December 2021 (week ending).
 "It's Beginning to Look A lot Like Christmas" re-entered the top 10 at number 9 on 16 December 2021 (week ending).
 "Rockin' Around the Christmas Tree" re-entered the top 10 at number 10 on 16 December 2021 (week ending), having originally peaked at number 6 upon release in 1962. It reached a new peak of number 5 on 6 January 2022 (week ending).
 "Seventeen Going Under" re-entered the top 10 at number 9 on 23 December 2021 (week ending).
 "It's Beginning to Look A lot Like Christmas" re-entered the top 10 at number 7 on 6 January 2022 (week ending).
 "Easy on Me" re-entered the top 10 at number-one on 13 January 2022 (week ending).
 "ABCDEFU" re-entered the top 10 at number 2 on 13 January 2022 (week ending).
 "Seventeen Going Under" re-entered the top 10 at number 3 on 13 January 2022 (week ending).
 "Coming for You" re-entered the top 10 at number 5 on 13 January 2022 (week ending).
 "Flowers (Say My Name)" re-entered the top 10 at number 7 on 13 January 2022 (week ending).
 "Overseas" re-entered the top 10 at number 8 on 13 January 2022 (week ending).
 "Shivers" re-entered the top 10 at number 10 on 13 January 2022 (week ending).
 "Flowers (Say My Name)" re-entered the top 10 at number 10 on 27 January 2022 (week ending).

References

External links
2021 singles chart archive at the Official Charts Company (click on relevant week)

United Kingdom top 10 singles
Top 10 singles
2021